The Miss Minnesota USA competition is the pageant that selects the representative for the state of Minnesota in the Miss USA pageant. It is directed by Future Productions based in Savage, Minnesota since its inception in 1995, which also directs the state pageants for Colorado, Iowa, North Dakota, South Dakota, Wisconsin and Wyoming.

Barbara Elaine Peterson was the first Miss Minnesota USA to be crowned Miss USA (in 1976), and was also the first Miss USA to not place in the Miss Universe pageant.  Her sister, Polly Peterson Bowles, was Miss Minnesota USA 1981.

In 2016, Halima Aden became the first contestant to compete wearing a burkini, and the first to wear a hijab the entire time. In 2017, Mikayla Holmgren was the first woman with Down syndrome to compete in a statewide Miss USA pageant.

The current titleholder is Madeline Helget of Clearwater was crowned on May 29, 2022, at Ames Center in Burnsville. She represented Minnesota for the title of Miss USA 2022, placed in the top 12.

Results summary

Placements
Miss USA: Barbara Peterson (1976)
2nd runners-up: Deborah Cossette (1977), Meridith Gould (2017)
3rd runners-up: Lanore Van Buren (2002)
4th runners-up: Kari Lee Johnson (1985)
Top 6:  Angelique de Maison (1995)
Top 10/12: Jodell Stirmlinger (1952), Carla Reid Peterson (1980), Jolene Stavrakis (1994), Madeline Helget (2022)
Top 15/19/20: Mary Ann Papke (1953), Dawn Joyce (1954), Kaylee Unverzagt (2008), Erica Nego (2009), Haley O'Brien (2014), Cat Stanley (2019)
  
Minnesota holds a record of 16 placements at Miss USA.

Awards
Miss Congeniality: Elizabeth Jane Carroll (1965), Janet Tveita (1990), Dottie Cannon (2006), Amber Davis (2020)
Miss Photogenic: Paige Swenson (2000), Sarah Cahill (2003)

Winners 

Color key

1 Age at the time of the Miss USA pageant
2 Contestant resigned title before the Miss USA pageant

References

External links
 
 Miss Minnesota-USA 2009 Official Website

Minnesota
Minnesota culture
Women in Minnesota
Recurring events established in 1952
Annual events in Minnesota
1952 establishments in Minnesota